12 Pegasi is a K-type supergiant star in the constellation of Pegasus. It has a spectral type of K0Ib Hdel0.5, which indicates that it is a less luminous K-type supergiant with strong H-δ Balmer lines. The star has expanded to 81 times the radius of the Sun, and has an effective temperature of 4,185 K.

References 

K-type supergiants
Pegasus (constellation)
Pegasi, 12
8321
207089
107472
Durchmusterung objects